Sandali Sinha (born 11 January 1972) is a former Indian Bollywood actress and model. She is known for her portrayal of Pia in the romantic film Tum Bin (2001).

Early life
She comes from an Air Force background. Her father, an officer, died while on duty. Her mother raised three children, including Sandali, in Delhi. She did her schooling from Air Force Bal Bharati School and graduated from Jesus and Mary College, Delhi. Sinha went to Kishore Namit Kapoor Acting Institute. Born in a family of pilots and doctors, Sinha was keen on becoming a doctor. But a brief experience on an amateur fashion show made her shift to the world of modelling.

Career
A graduate in commerce, Sinha shifted to Mumbai for better prospects. In a short period, Sinha became a model. Fame first came to her with a Sonu Nigam music video called "Deewana", which was directed by Anubhav Sinha. This music video took Sinha to her debut film Tum Bin, directed by Anubhav Sinha and produced by Super Cassettes Industries Limited. In the film, Sinha plays Pia, an innocent woman who becomes a victim of circumstances. Paired opposite her are three models: Priyanshu Chatterjee, Himanshu Malik and Raqesh Bapat.

Personal life
Sandali married Kiran Salaskar, a businessman, in  November 2005 and they have two children.

Filmography

Television

Films

See also
List of people from Bihar

References

External links

Sandali Sinha at SeasonsIndia.com

Indian film actresses
Living people
Female models from Bihar
21st-century Indian actresses
Actresses in Hindi cinema
Delhi University alumni
1972 births
Actresses from Bihar
People from Muzaffarpur